Jurassic World is a 2015 American science fiction action film directed by Colin Trevorrow, who co-wrote the screenplay with Rick Jaffa, Amanda Silver, and Derek Connolly from a story by Jaffa and Silver. It is the first installment in the Jurassic World trilogy and the fourth installment overall in the Jurassic Park film series. The film stars Chris Pratt, Bryce Dallas Howard, Vincent D'Onofrio, Ty Simpkins, Nick Robinson, Omar Sy, BD Wong, and Irrfan Khan. Set 22 years after the events of Jurassic Park (1993), Jurassic World takes place on the same fictional island of Isla Nublar, located off the Pacific coast of Costa Rica. A successful theme park of cloned dinosaurs, dubbed Jurassic World has operated on the island for years, bringing John Hammond's dream to fruition. The park plunges into chaos when a transgenic dinosaur escapes from its enclosure, and goes on a rampage, while a conspiracy orchestrated by the park's staff creates more dangers.

Universal Pictures intended to begin production of a fourth Jurassic Park film in 2004 for a mid-2005 release but was in development hell while the script underwent several revisions. Following a suggestion from executive producer Steven Spielberg, writers Jaffa and Silver explored the idea of a functional dinosaur park. Once Trevorrow was hired as director in 2013 he followed the same idea while developing a new script with Connolly. Filming lasted from April to August 2014 in Louisiana and Hawaii. The dinosaurs were created by Lucasfilm's Industrial Light & Magic using CGI and by Legacy Effects using life-sized animatronics. Production was completed in May 2015.

Jurassic World was theatrically released in the United States on June 12, 2015, by Universal Pictures. It was praised by critics, with many considering it to be the best Jurassic Park sequel. It grossed $1.6 billion worldwide, becoming the second-highest-grossing film of 2015 and the highest-grossing in the series. It was the third highest-grossing film of all time at its release and is the highest-grossing film released by Universal.

Two sequels have been released, Jurassic World: Fallen Kingdom (2018) and Jurassic World Dominion (2022).

Plot

Brothers Zach and Gray Mitchell visit Jurassic World, a dinosaur theme park on Isla Nublar, of which their aunt Claire Dearing is the operations manager. Claire assigns her assistant Zara as the boys' guide, but they evade her and explore on their own. Elsewhere on the island, Navy veteran and ethologist Owen Grady has been training a Velociraptor squad composed of Blue, Charlie, Delta, and Echo, and researching their intelligence. Based on the raptors' ability to follow commands, the head of InGen security Vic Hoskins believes that the animals can be weaponized, an idea Owen and his assistant Barry vehemently oppose.

Before its opening, Claire and park owner Simon Masrani inspect the park's newest attraction, the Indominus rex, a transgenic dinosaur created by geneticist Dr. Henry Wu. Masrani tasks Owen with evaluating the enclosure's security. Owen warns Claire that the Indominus lacks social skills, making it dangerous and unpredictable. When the Indominus seemingly escapes her compound, Owen and two park workers enter the enclosure. The Indominus, which can camouflage itself and mask its heat signature, suddenly appears. Owen survives, but she devours the other two men before escaping into the island's interior. Realizing that it is highly vicious and intelligent, Owen advises Masrani to have the specimen destroyed, but to protect his company's investment, Masrani dispatches a specialized unit to subdue it with non-lethal weaponry so that it can safely be returned to its paddock. After most of the unit is slaughtered, Claire orders the evacuation of the island's northern sector, while Masrani ponders Owen's warning and accosts Wu.

While exploring the park in a tour vehicle, Zach and Gray enter a restricted area. The Indominus arrives and destroys the vehicle, but the boys narrowly escape. They find the ruins of the original Jurassic Park visitor center, repair an old Jeep Wrangler, and drive back to the park resort. As Claire and Owen search for the boys, they barely escape the Indominus as well. Masrani and two troopers hunt down the Indominus by helicopter, but it breaks into the park's aviary. The Pteranodons and Dimorphodons, startled by the Indominus, flee the aviary and fly into Masrani's helicopter, resulting it in crashing and killing its passengers, before converging onto the resort, and attacking everyone, including Zara who is then devoured by a Mosasaurus. Zach and Gray find Owen and Claire at the resort as armed personnel shoot down the pterosaurs.

Assuming command, Hoskins orders the raptors to be used to track the Indominus, whereupon Owen reluctantly complies and spearheads the assault with the raptors. Upon finding the Indominus, the dinosaurs begin communicating among themselves. Owen realizes that the Indominus has Velociraptor DNA, and it usurps Owen's command of the raptors, becoming the pack's new alpha. Troops fire on the Indominus, but it escapes. The raptors slaughter most of the soldiers, while Charlie is killed in the chaos. Hoskins evacuates Dr. Wu and the dinosaur embryos from the island to protect Dr. Wu's research. Owen, Claire, and the boys find Hoskins at the lab securing more embryos, but Delta breaks in and kills him. Owen re-establishes his bond with the three surviving raptors before the Indominus reappears. They attack the hybrid, but Delta and Echo are killed while Blue is knocked unconscious. Claire releases the Jurassic Park’s veteran Tyrannosaurus rex from its paddock and lures it into a battle with the Indominus. The Indominus eventually gains the advantage over the Tyrannosaurus until Blue recovers and joins the battle. The duo overwhelms the Indominus until it gets cornered at the lagoon's edge, where it is dragged underwater by the resident Mosasaurus.

The survivors are evacuated and the island is abandoned once again. Zach and Gray are reunited with their parents, while Owen and Claire decide to stay together.

Cast

 Chris Pratt as Owen Grady, a Navy veteran and ethologist, and a Velociraptor expert and handler at Jurassic World.
 Bryce Dallas Howard as Claire Dearing, the Jurassic World operations manager and aunt to Zach and Gray Mitchell.
 Vincent D'Onofrio as Vic Hoskins, head of InGen's security operations, who wants to use the Velociraptors as military animals.
 Ty Simpkins as Gray Mitchell, one of Claire's nephews and the younger brother of Zach.
 Nick Robinson as Zach Mitchell, one of Claire's nephews and the older brother of Gray.
 Omar Sy as Barry Sembène, Owen's assistant who helps care for the raptors.
 BD Wong as Dr. Henry Wu, a geneticist who heads the team that created the dinosaurs for Jurassic World as well as the failed original Jurassic Park.
 Irrfan Khan as Simon Masrani, CEO of the Masrani Corporation and the owner of Jurassic World.

 Jake Johnson as Lowery Cruthers, an employee in the park's control room
 Lauren Lapkus as Vivian, an employee in the park's control room
 Brian Tee as Hamada, the leader of the ACU (Asset Containment Unit), a group of security guards installed on Isla Nublar
 Katie McGrath as Zara, Claire's personal assistant.
 Judy Greer as Karen Mitchell, Claire's sister and mother of Zach and Gray.
 Andy Buckley as Scott Mitchell, Karen's husband and father of Zach and Gray.

Additionally, Jimmy Fallon and Jimmy Buffett appear in cameo as themselves, while the film's producer, Patrick Crowley, plays Masrani's flight instructor. Colin Trevorrow briefly provides the voice of Mr. DNA, an animated DNA helix who explains the park's technology to visitors, a character voiced by Greg Burson in Jurassic Park. Brad Bird provides a voice cameo as the park's monorail announcer and Jack Horner, the film's technical advisor, also makes a cameo appearance. Eric Edelstein appears briefly as a paddock supervisor. A photograph of Jeff Goldblum is used to represent his character Dr. Ian Malcolm on the back cover of a book.

Themes and analysis
Director Colin Trevorrow stated that the Indominus rex, the synthetic hybrid dinosaur at the center of the film's story, is symbolic of consumer and corporate excess. The dinosaur was "meant to embody [humanity's] worst tendencies. We're surrounded by wonder and yet we want more, and we want it bigger, faster, louder, better. And in the world of the movie, the animal is designed based on a series of corporate focus groups". He also stated that "there's something in the film about our greed and our desire for profit. The Indominus rex, to me, is very much that desire, that need to be satisfied". Film journalists have noted parallels between the workings of the park in Jurassic World and of the film and entertainment industry. Actor James DuMont, who has a small role in the film, said "the person [and] the environment are one" is an obvious theme; another theme is "those who do not stop evil are supporting and encouraging it".

The film also explores animal rights concepts; the Indominus rex was raised in captivity and in complete isolation, making the creature "not fully functional". Trevorrow has cited the 2013 documentary film Blackfish, which is critical of captive orca at SeaWorld, as a key inspiration for Jurassic World. Captive orca Tilikum, which was raised partly in isolation and was responsible for the deaths of three people, served as an inspiration for the Indominus rex, and the public relations and corporate excesses of SeaWorld depicted in the documentary inspired the fictional park in Jurassic World.

Production

Development
In May 2001, Steven Spielberg had Amblin Entertainment commence development of ideas for Jurassic Park IV, which he planned to produce. Initially, Jurassic Park III director Joe Johnston was not interested in directing the fourth film. In 2002, William Monahan was announced as screenwriter, and a release date was set for mid-2005. Kathleen Kennedy would produce the film, and Spielberg would serve as executive producer.

An early story idea would partially involve dinosaurs migrating to the Costa Rican mainland. A team of experts, including Dr. Alan Grant and Dr. Ian Malcolm, would chart an expedition to an offshore island and discover the dinosaurs breeding freely. Part of the plot would involve the characters devising a way to restrict the spread of the dinosaurs and prevent an ecological disaster. Early concept art also depicted genetically engineered human-dinosaur mercenaries. Monahan's first draft of the script was finished in July 2003; the story was not set in a jungle, as in previous films. Monahan subsequently left the project to work on Kingdom of Heaven. He was replaced by John Sayles, who wrote two drafts of the script. In one draft, a new character, a mercenary named Nick Harris, would be charged with training a team of genetically modified Deinonychus for use on rescue missions and to combat drug dealers. The concept of a human who trains dinosaurs came from Spielberg. By April 2005, the film had been postponed, as Spielberg was dissatisfied with the script revisions.

Frank Marshall would eventually join the project as a producer. Progress on the film stalled during 2005 as Marshall and Spielberg were busy with other film projects. Additional work on the film was expected to begin following the release of a fourth Indiana Jones film, which Marshall and Spielberg were working on. In 2006, Spielberg said Johnston would direct the film, but by April 2007, Johnston was no longer involved as director. A release date of 2008 was expected, but was later delayed to 2009. By 2010, Johnston was involved with the project again and planned for the film to be the first in a new Jurassic Park trilogy. Johnston hoped to further develop the project with Spielberg after they finished other projects, including Johnston's 2011 film, Captain America: The First Avenger.

In 2011, writer Mark Protosevich was hired. He wrote two story treatments, neither of which were approved. Spielberg and Kennedy felt that the film did not yet have an adequate story. In 2012, Rick Jaffa and Amanda Silver were hired to write the script. The writers incorporated three ideas from Spielberg: a fully functioning dinosaur theme park, a human who has a relationship with trained raptors (from Sayles's earlier draft), and a human-eating dinosaur that escapes and has to be stopped. The concept of a dinosaur with a chameleon-like ability to render itself nearly invisible is a plot device from Crichton's The Lost World novel that had not been used in the previous films.

Pre-production
In January 2013, Universal set a release date of June 13, 2014. Kennedy later left the project in February as she would be busy with the upcoming Star Wars sequel trilogy. A month later, Colin Trevorrow was hired as director, and Patrick Crowley was announced as a producer alongside Marshall. Trevorrow and his writing partner, Derek Connolly, rewrote the earlier draft by Jaffa and Silver, while retaining Spielberg's three story ideas. The film's release was delayed by a year to give the writers time to perfect the script. In September, Universal confirmed the film's title Jurassic World, with a release scheduled for June 12, 2015. The film is set 22 years after the events of Jurassic Park, and is considered a direct sequel to that film; although The Lost World: Jurassic Park and Jurassic Park III remain canon in the series, Jurassic World ignores their events as they occurred on a different island.

Between 2003 and 2008, several cast members from previous Jurassic Park films were expected to reprise their roles, including Sam Neill as Dr. Alan Grant, Jeff Goldblum as Dr. Ian Malcolm, Richard Attenborough as John Hammond, and Laura Dern as Dr. Ellie Sattler. Attenborough retired from acting following a fall at his house in 2008. A statue of his character is featured in the film. Trevorrow and Connolly did not want to bring back the other characters unless there would be a good reason for them to be involved in the story; they considered Dr. Henry Wu, the scientist responsible for recreating dinosaurs, a logical choice.

Ty Simpkins and Nick Robinson were cast as the child characters in October 2013. Bryce Dallas Howard and Chris Pratt were cast in the lead roles. 

Vincent D'Onofrio and Irrfan Khan were cast in early 2014, and BD Wong was cast to reprise his role of Dr. Henry Wu, marking the character's first appearance since the original Jurassic Park film in 1993.

Filming
Principal photography began on April 10, 2014, in Hawaii. The budget was reported to be $150 million. Filming locations there included the islands of Kauai and Oahu. The Indominus rex enclosure was among the shooting locations in Hawaii. Filming continued in Hawaii until June, before moving to Louisiana. The Main Street and boardwalk area of the fictional Jurassic World theme park was constructed in the parking lot of the abandoned Six Flags New Orleans park. NASA's Michoud Assembly Facility in New Orleans was also used to construct interior sets representing the Jurassic World park. Other sets constructed at the facility included a Mosasaurus feeding show and a raptor enclosure.

The film includes a scene in which Claire's assistant Zara (portrayed by Katie McGrath) is carried off by several Pteranodon before falling into the park's lagoon, where she is eaten by the Mosasaurus, marking the first female death in the film series. Trevorrow wanted to make it "the most spectacular death we can possibly imagine", while also wanting to surprise moviegoers, stating: "Let's have someone die who just doesn't deserve to die at all."

Stan Winston provided animatronic dinosaurs for the previous Jurassic Park films, and intended to do the same for the fourth film prior to his death in 2008. Instead, Winston's former colleagues at Legacy Effects provided an animatronic Apatosaurus for the film. Maquettes were used to depict the velociraptors during certain scenes, and some dinosaurs were created through the use of motion capture. The remaining dinosaurs were computer-generated by Industrial Light & Magic. Filming concluded on August 5 the same year.

Music

The musical score was composed by Michael Giacchino, who had previously scored the video games Warpath: Jurassic Park and The Lost World: Jurassic Park. John Williams' themes from previous Jurassic Park scores were incorporated by Giacchino, who said: "It was a really targeted approach, as to where to [include Williams's themes] and where would make the most sense and where would we most appreciate it, as fans ourselves". A soundtrack album was released on June 9, 2015, by Back Lot Music.

Marketing 
The first official pictures of the film set were released in April 2014, and were followed by the release of the first film stills in June. During the San Diego Comic-Con convention in July, five hundred copies of a limited-edition Jurassic World poster by Mark Englert were given out. Audiences at the convention were disappointed by the lack of Jurassic World footage; what they thought to be footage for the film was a teaser trailer announcement for Legendary Pictures' upcoming film, Skull Island.

Two viral marketing websites, one for the fictional Masrani Global Corporation and one for the Jurassic World theme park, were launched in November 2014. The Masrani website was created by Jack Anthony Ewins and Timothy Glover, two Jurassic Park fans who had earlier created a website for the fictional Patel Corporation. Khan was initially reported to be playing a park owner with the surname Patel; after some fans mistook the Patel website for an official website associated with the film, Universal hired Ewins and Glover in April the same year to design the official Masrani website and to add their own backstory details to it. The Masrani website included information that was absent from the film, such as details of the company's purchase of InGen and about the park's origins. The Masrani website also included videos showing D'Onofrio and Wong talking in-character about the fictional company.

The theme park website featured a high level of fictional detail, including hotel accommodations, weather reports and wait times for rides. Paleontologist Brian Switek was hired in early 2015 to ensure the accuracy of dinosaur information on the theme park website. Trevorrow wrote fictional customer comments for the site; he said: "It was then that I realized I'd gone too far down the rabbit hole." Closed circuit video shown on the control room monitors was filmed during production and was also added to the theme park website.

A teaser trailer was released online on November 23, 2014, followed by the first full trailer two days later; it had initially been scheduled to air on NBC two days later during a Thanksgiving football game. The film was marketed with the tagline "The park is open". Marketing continued in 2015: a television advertisement for the film premiered during Super Bowl XLIX in February. A clip from the film was aired on MTV on April 8, and depicted the character Owen arguing with Claire about the treatment of the park's dinosaurs. Film director and writer Joss Whedon criticized the clip, calling it "'70s-era sexist": "She's a stiff, he's a life-force—really? Still?" Trevorrow later stated he was not bothered by Whedon's comments and that "to be honest, I don't totally disagree with him. I wonder why [Universal] chose a clip like that, that shows an isolated situation within a movie that has an internal logic. That starts with characters that are almost archetypes, stereotypes that are deconstructed as the story progresses." Howard also considered the clip to be a marketing mistake.

Later in April, three new posters for the film were released during a three-day period leading up to the premiere of the final trailer. Trevorrow was disappointed with Universal because he felt the trailers showed "far more of this movie than I would have ever wanted". Trevorrow stated that because of the film's cost, the trailers included scenes Universal felt were necessary to ensure its financial success after the studio's disappointment with Jurassic Park III'''s box-office performance. Universal spent $34.9 million on television advertisements for the film. Companies including Kellogg's, Dairy Queen and Barbasol served as promotional partners for the film, and Lego and Hasbro released toys based on it. Two video games, Lego Jurassic World and Jurassic World: The Game, were released in 2015. Tippett Studio worked with Universal and Efexio to create an application titled "Jurassic World Mobile MovieMaker", which adds images of dinosaurs to a background photograph.

Release
Theatrical
The world premiere of Jurassic World was held on May 29, 2015, at the Grand Rex cinema in Paris. The film was theatrically released in 66 territories from June 10 to 12. In North America, advance screenings were held at Majestic 10 Cinemas in Williston, Vermont on the 10th, before opening two days later in 4,273 venues, the largest-ever screen count for Universal. The film was released in Japan on August 5, the last market in which it was released.

Worldwide, Jurassic World was released across 809 IMAX theaters—364 of which were in North America—making it the third-largest worldwide release for any movie in IMAX's history and the largest day-and-date IMAX release ever. Universal relaunched the film in IMAX 3D in theaters for one week on August 28 in the United States and Canada.

Home mediaJurassic World was released by Universal Pictures Home Entertainment on DVD, Blu-ray, and Blu-ray 3D on October 20, 2015. Upon release, it sold nearly three million Blu-ray and DVD units in its first week, making it the highest-selling home entertainment live-action film, both for Universal and of 2015. Across all digital and physical formats, Jurassic World collected $82.6 million in its first week. At the end of 2015, it was named the second-highest-selling video of the year in the UK, selling 1.05 million copies since its release. It was the third-highest-selling DVD and the second-highest-selling Blu-ray in the country. In 2018, Jurassic World was included in the Jurassic Park 25th Anniversary Collection.

Reception
Box officeJurassic World grossed $653.4 million in the United States and Canada and $1.018 billion in other countries for a worldwide total of $1.672 billion. It set a box office record during its opening weekend, becoming the first film to collect over $500 million in a single weekend. The film crossed the $1 billion mark within 14 days, making it the fastest film at the time to reach that milestone, surpassing Furious 7. Deadline Hollywood calculated the film's net profit as $474 million, accounting for production budgets, marketing, talent participations, and other costs; box office grosses and home media revenues placed it third on their list of 2015's "Most Valuable Blockbusters". It is also the second of three films following Furious 7 and Minions to surpass $1 million in 4DX admissions worldwide.

United States and Canada
Predictions for the opening of Jurassic World in the U.S. and Canada were continuously revised upwards, starting from $125 million to $200 million. It opened on Friday, June 12, 2015, in 4,274 theaters and earned $81.9 million on its opening day, marking the fifth-biggest opening day and the fifth-biggest single-day gross, as well as the highest June opening day, surpassing The Twilight Saga: Eclipse. The film's Friday gross included $18.5 million from 3,229 theaters in its early Thursday showings—a record for Universal. Excluding Thursday-night grosses, the film earned the largest opening-day gross ($63.5 million). It also set a single-day IMAX record of $8.6 million and a Saturday-and-Sunday gross record of $69.6 million and $57.2 million, respectively. In total, it earned $208,806,270 for its debut weekend, setting an opening-weekend record and an IMAX opening record of $20.6 million—10.2% of the total opening gross—from 363 IMAX theaters, surpassing The Avengers and The Dark Knight Rises simultaneously. Additionally, it had the largest June opening weekend, breaking the previous record held by Man of Steel. 3D accounted for 48% of the total opening gross. RealD 3D comprised $70 million of the opening gross. The opening-weekend audience was evenly split between under-25s over-25s—39% were under age 25, 61% age 25 years and above. 52% of the audience were male and 48% were female. On its fourth day of release, Jurassic World made $25.6 million, making it the third-highest Monday gross, after Spider-Man 2 and Indiana Jones and the Kingdom of the Crystal Skull. This was also the biggest non-holiday Monday gross of any film at the time, knocking out The Dark Knight.

The film set a record for the largest second-weekend gross, its revenue dropping by 49% to $106.6 million and it topped the North American box office for three consecutive weekends. Other records set by the film at the time include the biggest weekend-per-theater average for a wide release—$48,855 per theater— the fastest film to reach $100 million and each additional $50 million through $600 million, and the largest cumulative gross through every day of release until and including its fifty-third day—with the exception of its first day. As of June 21, 2015, screenings in RealD, IMAX and premium large format had grossed $132 million, $42 million and $23.1 million, respectively. On Friday, July 17, the movie's revenue reached $600 million, becoming the fourth and quickest to do so in 36 days.

Other territoriesJurassic World was released in 63 countries. Outside the United States and Canada, the film opened on Wednesday, June 10, in eight countries, earning $24 million. On Thursday, June 11, it grossed another $46 million from 37 markets for a two-day total of $70 million from 45 countries. It was released in 21 more countries on June 12, earning $60 million, which is Universal's highest-grossing international Friday of all time, for a three-day total of $130 million from 66 countries. Until Sunday, June 14, it had a five-day opening weekend total of $316.1 million from 66 countries from 19,612 screens, representing 31% of its overseas gross and setting an opening-weekend record, beating Harry Potter and the Deathly Hallows – Part 2. This included an IMAX opening record of $23.5 million from 443 IMAX theaters in 56 countries, surpassing the record that was previously held by Transformers: Age of Extinction. 3D showings accounted for 65% of the film's revenue (equivalent to $205 million). Additional records include the highest single-day IMAX gross with $6.5 million on Saturday, June 12. Revenues in its second weekend dropped by 47.4% to $166.7 million, according to Box Office Mojo. Deadline Hollywood reported a 48.3% drop to $163.4 million. Jurassic World topped the box office outside of North America for three consecutive weekends.

The film had the biggest opening day of all time for Universal in Hong Kong; the second-biggest in Australia, France, Indonesia, the Philippines, Russia, and South Korea; and the biggest opening day of all time in Panama. It also scored the biggest opening for Universal in nine countries, including Australia, China, Ecuador, France, Hong Kong, and Malta. In China, it grossed $17.77 million on its opening day (including $1.39 million from midnight runs), which is the tenth-biggest of all time and went on to earn $100.1 million in its opening weekend, which is the third-biggest of all time. It also scored the second-biggest IMAX opening there with $11.8 million. Following China, its largest openings outside of the U.S. and Canada occurred in the UK, Ireland and Malta ($30.1 million), France and the Maghreb region ($14.7 million), Mexico ($14.6 million), South Korea ($14.2 million) and Japan ($13 million). In South Korea, the film was released during the 2015 MERS outbreak as the U.S. film studios are debarred from altering their scheduled dates, resulting the film's attendance to fall from that date and the local films' release dates to be postponed by their distributors. IMAX tickets sales grossed $42.1 million as of June 21, 2015. In total earnings, its largest markets outside the United States and Canada were China ($205.2 million), the United Kingdom ($100.4 million), Japan ($75.2 million), Germany ($49.2 million), Mexico ($44.3 million), and South Korea ($43.9 million).

Critical response
On the review aggregator website Rotten Tomatoes, Jurassic World has an approval rating of 71% based on 358 reviews and an average rating of 6.6/10. Its critical consensus reads: "Jurassic World can't match the original for sheer inventiveness and impact, but it works in its own right as an entertaining – and visually dazzling – popcorn thriller". On Metacritic, the film has a score of 59 out of 100 based on 49 critics, indicating "mixed or average reviews". Audiences polled by CinemaScore gave the film an average grade of "A" on an A+ to F scale.

Peter Bradshaw of The Guardian gave the film four stars out of five and said it is a "terrifically enjoyable and exciting summer spectacular" and "savvy, funny, ridiculous in just the right way". Robbie Collin of The Telegraph also awarded it four stars, deeming it a worthy sequel to the original Jurassic Park and calling it "methodically paced and shot with an awestruck visual sense that's pure Spielberg". Peter Travers of Rolling Stone gave it three stars out of four and wrote: "It's not the cynical, cash-in cheesefest you feared. OK, Jurassic World is a little of that. But this state-of-the-art dino epic is also more than a blast of rumbling, roaring, 'did you effing see that!' fun". He praised Trevorrow's direction, Pratt's and Howard's performances and the effects. Writing for The Hollywood Reporter, Todd McCarthy said the film was not "terribly scary" and criticized the romance between Owen and Claire, but he praised the CGI implementation, the film's musical score, and claimed there is a "certain low-key affability about Trevorrow’s approach that marks him a likeable humanist". UK film website Movie Metropolis rated the film four stars out of five noting that while Jurassic World is missing some "soul" and "charm" from the original, it is the first sequel "worthy of the brand". David Crow, writing for Den of Geek, considered Jurassic World a legacy sequel and wrote that it gave fans "everything they loved about the first one without trying to change things up".

The Associated Press praised Pratt and Howard's performances but rated the film two stars out of four, calling it "an ugly, over-saturated movie" that lacks the "deft sense of wonderment, wit and suspense that guided the original". Ann Hornaday of The Washington Post also rated it two stars out of four, writing "every action movie today ends up as Transformers and, even when it's cloned creatures fighting, the same is true here (with an antic dash of "Sharknado" tossed in for good measure). It's not ambition or technical know-how or even plucky resourcefulness that save the day in Jurassic World, it's good old-fashioned anthropomorphism. Humans, it seems, never learn. But if we did, where would sequels come from?"

Spielberg said, "To see Jurassic World come to life is almost like seeing Jurassic Park come true", while Sam Neill also praised the film and its acting. Several news publications, as well as Neill, noted the violence of the franchise's first notable depiction of a woman being killed onscreen, and Entertainment Weekly wrote: "There's nothing amusing about the demise of Zara, who's as close to 'real people' as Jurassic World gets, and it's that unsettling quality about her death that more Hollywood disaster epics need in order to reclaim their visceral emotional prowess". Several news outlets, such as The New York Times, New York and Slate, considered the film's depiction of Claire, including her use of high heels throughout the film, to be sexist. Additionally, several websites have noted plot and character similarities between Jurassic World and the 1999 film Deep Blue Sea. Entertainment website Dark Horizons stated in its coverage of Jurassic World that "some aren't warming to the Deep Blue Sea meets Jaws 3-D storyline", while entertainment website Flickering Myth posted the story "Deja Vu: Isn't Jurassic World just Deep Blue Sea with dinosaurs?", which outlined plot and character similarities between the two films.

Accolades
In December 2015, the Academy of Motion Picture Arts and Sciences placed Jurassic World on its shortlist of potential nominees for the Academy Award for Best Visual Effects at the 88th Academy Awards but was not nominated for an Academy Award. The film received the following nominations and awards from other organizations:

Controversies
Scientific accuracy

To maintain continuity with the previous films, Jurassic World does not feature any feathered dinosaurs. The first Jurassic Park film was lauded by paleontologists for depicting dinosaurs accurately and in keeping with the science of the time, but later discoveries have refuted the view of dinosaurs as invariably scaly creatures. Jurassic World was criticized for purposely ignoring new discoveries and knowledge. Several paleontologists called the film a "dumb monster movie" for failing to include new discoveries about the creatures; for example, the feathers or proto-feathers that covered some dinosaurs and the way Velociraptor held its front limbs. Many paleontologists considered the dinosaurs a retrograde step from the original Jurassic Park.

In response to these criticisms, Trevorrow said that Jurassic World was not meant as a documentary film, but as a sci-fi film. The film includes a scene addressing the topic, as Dr. Henry Wu says that such inaccuracies can be attributed to the fact that the dinosaurs are genetically engineered animals. A fictional review on the film's theme park website speculates that the use of amphibian DNA to fill the gaps in the dinosaur DNA—a plot point in the original novel and film—prevented the dinosaurs from growing feathers. The filmmakers had planned to depict feathered dinosaurs early in the film's development.

Writing credits dispute

At the end of March 2015, a Writers Guild of America (WGA) arbitration panel ruled that Rick Jaffa and Amanda Silver would receive credit for writing the screenplay with Trevorrow and Connolly, who disagreed with the decision, although they decided that under WGA rules they had no grounds to appeal. They accepted the ruling on March 31. On April 2, Universal Pictures originally wanted Trevorrow and Connolly to be credited for the screenplay; they were credited in the film's Super Bowl trailer as the only writers. It was then reported that they appealed the WGA's decision, that they wrote an entirely new screenplay that was not based on Jaffa and Silver's draft, and that they wanted full writing credit for the script.

Five days later on April 7, the arbiters had unanimously denied Trevorrow's and Connolly's appeal in a second hearing held on April 3, and that they gave Jaffa and Silver an additional credit for writing the original story. Trevorrow and Connolly appealed the decision. Later that day, Trevorrow said he and Connolly had not appealed the WGA's original decision to give Jaffa and Silver co-credit for the screenplay, despite disagreeing with it. He also stated that he and Connolly were not informed of the second hearing until it was already over. The credits of the screenplay ultimately went to both writing teams; Jaffa and Silver were also being credited for writing the original story.

Sequels

Trevorrow said in 2014 that sequels to Jurassic World had been discussed. The first sequel, titled Jurassic World: Fallen Kingdom, was released in June 2018. Trevorrow and Connolly returned to write the script for the sequel, which features Pratt and Howard reprising their roles, The film also introduces another main character, named Maisie Lockwood, portrayed by Isabella Sermon. Trevorrow acted as an executive producer with Spielberg. J. A. Bayona directed the film, which serves as the middle chapter of the Jurassic World trilogy. Jurassic World Dominion was released in June 2022, with Trevorrow returning as director. Pratt and Howard also reprise their roles.

Rides and other mediaJurassic World eventually led to several theme park rides. Jurassic World: The Ride opened at Universal Studios Hollywood in 2019. It is a refurbishment of the original Jurassic Park: The Ride, which operated from 1996 to 2018. In 2021, Universal's Islands of Adventure opened a roller coaster attraction known as VelociCoaster, based on the Jurassic World films.

The film also led to animated projects, including several in the Lego Jurassic World line, such as Lego Jurassic World: The Indominus Escape, a 2016 short film; Lego Jurassic World: The Secret Exhibit, a 2018 television special; and Lego Jurassic World: Legend of Isla Nublar, a 2019 miniseries.

A 3D-animated television series, titled Jurassic World Camp Cretaceous, premiered on September 18, 2020. It was a co-production between Netflix and DreamWorks Animation. 37 episodes have been released over 4 seasons.

In 2018, Frontier Developments released Jurassic World Evolution'', a film-based construction and management simulation game that allows players to build their own Jurassic World park.

References

External links

 
 Masrani Global Corporation (fictional) website
 
 
 
 Jurassic World News & Updates
 Official UK Jurassic World International website

 

Jurassic Park films
Films about dinosaurs
Giant monster films
American monster movies
2010s monster movies
2015 films
2010s English-language films
2015 3D films
2010s science fiction adventure films
2015 science fiction action films
American action adventure films
American science fiction adventure films
American science fiction action films
American sequel films
Films based on works by Michael Crichton
Films set in 2015
Films set in amusement parks
Films set in Costa Rica
Films set on fictional islands
Films set in Madison, Wisconsin
Films set in zoos
Films shot in Hawaii
Films shot in Louisiana
Films shot in New Orleans
IMAX films
Legendary Pictures films
Films using motion capture
Amblin Entertainment films
Universal Pictures films
The Kennedy/Marshall Company films
Films scored by Michael Giacchino
Films directed by Colin Trevorrow
Films produced by Frank Marshall
Films with screenplays by Derek Connolly
Films with screenplays by Colin Trevorrow
Films with screenplays by Rick Jaffa and Amanda Silver
Films about animal cruelty
Films about consumerism
4DX films
2010s American films